The Swamp Ghost is a Boeing B-17E Flying Fortress piloted by Captain Frederick 'Fred' C. Eaton, Jr, that ditched in a swamp on  Papua New Guinea during the Second World War, after an attack on ships at Japanese-occupied New Britain on February 23, 1942. While flying over Rabaul, it was intercepted and eventually, having run out of fuel, had to force-land in a remote swamp near the north coast of New Guinea. All of the crew survived the crash landing and arduous trek out.

Discovery
The aircraft was rediscovered in 1972 in Agaiambo swamp, where it earned the nickname Swamp Ghost. In 1989, the Travis Air Force Base Heritage Center planned to recover it. It was salvaged in 2006 and moved to Lae wharf where it lay waiting for permission to be transferred to the United States.  By February 2010, the wreck had been cleared for import to the United States.

Display and restoration

In 2010, the aircraft was shipped to the United States, and on June 11, 2010, was shown to a public gathering in Long Beach, California, that included family members of the original crew.  Plans were made to bring Swamp Ghost to the Pima Air & Space Museum in Tucson for restoration to static display. After arriving at Long Beach, the aircraft was on indefinite loan to the Planes of Fame Air Museum at Chino Airport.

The Swamp Ghost was received by the Pacific Aviation Museum in Pearl Harbor on April 10, 2013. As of August 2013, the museum planned to restore the aircraft for static display in Hangar 79 on Ford Island. , the aircraft is on display in Hangar 79, undergoing restoration.

See also
 List of surviving Boeing B-17 Flying Fortresses

References

External links 
 John Weeks webpage - phot of Swamp Ghost
  The Swamp Ghost, Retrieved on April 10, 2009, 
 Pacific Wrecks - B-17E Serial Number 41-2446 (aka 'Swamp Ghost'), Retrieved on April 10, 2009
 Swamp Ghost website
 Google Maps satellite image of the Swamp Ghost
 Aero Archaeology video of Swamp Ghost
 Swamp Ghost at the Pacific Aviation Museum in Pearl Harbor

Individual aircraft of World War II
South West Pacific theatre of World War II
Papua New Guinea in World War II
Aviation accidents and incidents in 1942
Aviation accidents and incidents in Papua New Guinea
Boeing B-17 Flying Fortress
1942 disasters in Papua New Guinea 
1942 in Papua New Guinea